MJET is an Austrian air operator headquartered in Schwechat and based at Vienna International Airport.

Overview
Established in 2007, the company is specialized in business jet management and operations, as well as in other aviation-related activities, including consulting, flight support, aircraft sales & acquisitions, new or used aircraft deliveries. An operations control center, coordinating the company's worldwide operations, is located at MJET's headquarters in Schwechat, Austria, close to Vienna International Airport. 

MJET's Airbus ACJ319 was displayed by Airbus S.A.S. several times at aviation exhibitions between 2014 and 2018.

Fleet

Current fleet
The MJET fleet consists of the following aircraft:

Former aircraft types 
The following aircraft types have been operated or managed by MJET in the past and phased-out or replaced with newer jets: Gulfstream V, Hawker 900XP, Hawker 750, Challenger 601, Fokker 100EJ* and Airbus A320 VIP.

References

External links 

 

Airlines of Austria
Airlines established in 2007